The 2013 AFL season was the 117th season of the Australian Football League (AFL), the highest level senior Australian rules football competition in Australia, which was known as the Victorian Football League until 1989. The season featured eighteen clubs, ran from 22 March until 28 September, and comprised a 22-game home-and-away season followed by a finals series featuring the top eight clubs.

The premiership was won by the Hawthorn Football Club for the eleventh time, after it defeated  by 15 points in the 2013 AFL Grand Final.

Pre-season

All Stars game
The biennial All Star game played in the Northern Territory, featuring an AFL team and the Indigenous All Stars team, made up of some of the best Indigenous players in the game, returned for the 2013 pre-season. Richmond were selected as the AFL team to partake in the game, which was played at Traeger Park in Alice Springs.

NAB Cup

The 2013 NAB Cup was won by the Brisbane Lions, their first ever win preseason competition win, when they defeated Carlton by 40 points.

Premiership season
The full fixture was released on Wednesday 31 October 2012.

 For the second consecutive year, the AFL's opening round was spread across two weekends.
 None of the bottom five teams from 2012 (and ) featured in a Friday night match during the home-and-away season. This is due to the AFL's policy of awarding Friday night matches only to teams that perform consistently throughout the season.
 This season was the last in which AFL football was played at AAMI Stadium, with both  and  moving to a redeveloped Adelaide Oval from the 2014 season.
 Match starting times are local.

Round 1

Round 2

Round 3

Round 4

Round 5

Round 6

Round 7

Round 8

Round 9

Round 10

Round 11

Round 12

Round 13

Round 14

Round 15

Round 16

Round 17

Round 18

Round 19

Round 20

Round 21

Round 22

Round 23

Win/loss table

Bold – Home game
X – Bye
Opponent for round listed above margin

Ladder

Ladder progression

Finals series

Week one

Week two

Week three

Week four

Attendances

By club

By ground

Awards
The AFL Players Association awards
The AFL Coaches Association Awards were as follows:
The Allan Jeans Senior Coach of the Year Award was awarded to Ken Hinkley of 
The Lifetime Achievement Award was awarded to George Stone.

Coleman Medal

Numbers highlighted in blue indicates the player led the Coleman that round.
Underlined numbers indicates the player did not play that round.

Best and fairest

Club leadership

Club membership

Coach changes

Post-season

International Rules Series

The International Rules Series was played between Australia and Ireland for the first time since 2011. For the first time, the Australian team was represented by the Indigenous All Stars. As in previous years, two test matches were played, and the series was decided on aggregate. The series was held in Ireland, and was won by Ireland 2-0 and on an aggregate margin of 173-72 points.

Notable events and controversies

Adelaide Crows–Kurt Tippett contract scandal
During the trade period leading up to the 2013 season, Adelaide Crows forward Kurt Tippett sought to be traded. During trade negotiations, information was uncovered which brought into question the legality under AFL rules of Tippett's 2009 contract extension with Adelaide. The AFL investigated Tippett's contract during October and November, and charged Tippett and Adelaide with a total of eleven charges relating to draft tampering and breaching the total player payments, including:
Arranging a secret deal in which Tippett would be traded to a club of his choice at the end of 2012
Direct payments of $100,000 outside the salary cap in each of 2011 and 2012
Illegally arranging third-party deals in 2011 and 2012, resulting in Tippett receiving further money outside the salary cap in those years.

Adelaide was considered likely to incur a loss of draft picks, among other penalties, if found guilty, but the AFL Commission was yet to complete its hearing into the matter when the National Draft was held on 22 November 2012, so the club was permitted to participate in the draft as normal. However, on the day before the draft, the club voluntarily relinquished its highest two remaining selections (No. 20 and 54) as a "gesture of goodwill" ahead of the hearing.

The final hearing took place on 30 November, and Adelaide and Tippett pleaded guilty to all charges. Adelaide was stripped of its first and second round draft picks, and banned from taking any father-son selections, in the 2013 National Draft, and received a $300,000 fine. Tippett was suspended for the 2013 NAB Cup and 11 premiership matches, with a further suspended sentence of 11 matches, and received a $50,000 fine. Several senior Adelaide personnel were also punished by the league: chief executive Steven Trigg and former football manager John Reid were each fined $50,000 and banned from AFL functions for six months (with a further suspended sentence of six months), and current football manager Phil Harper was banned from AFL functions for two months with a four-month suspended sentence. In a separate hearing in January 2013, the AFL Players' Association revoked the accreditation of Tippett's manager, Peter Blucher, for at least one year.

Melbourne Football Club tanking scandal

Throughout the 2012/13 offseason, the league investigated the Melbourne Football Club over allegations that it had tanked during the latter part of the 2009 season – that is, that it had intentionally lost matches near the end of the season so that it would finish with no more than four wins, and therefore receive a priority draft pick. The league released its findings in February 2013, and found the club not guilty of tanking.

However, it did find two of Melbourne's then-senior staff members – senior coach Dean Bailey and general manager of football operations Chris Connolly – guilty of "acting in a manner prejudicial to the interests of the competition". This related most specifically to a meeting in July 2009, which became known colloquially as "the vault", in which Connolly allegedly openly discussed the potential benefits to the club of tanking. The guilty parties received the following penalties:
 Connolly, who was still at the club in 2013 but serving in a role outside the football department, was suspended outright from serving in any position at any club until 1 February 2014. Connolly was sacked by Melbourne in October 2013.
 Bailey, serving in 2013 as an assistant coach at the Adelaide Crows, was suspended from his position for the first sixteen weeks of the 2013 season, preventing him from having any contact with the Crows' playing group during that time.
 The Melbourne Football Club, which was complicit to the infraction in its capacity as Connolly's and Bailey's employer, was fined $500,000.

None of Melbourne, Connolly or Bailey contested these penalties.

Essendon Football Club supplements controversy 

On 5 February the Essendon Football Club asked the Australian Sports Anti-Doping Authority (ASADA) to investigate the concerns over the clubs possible use of un-approved supplements during the 2012 season.

An internal independent review conducted by Dr. Ziggy Switkowski regarding the Essendon Football Club governance processes was released to the public on 6 May.

While ASADA investigated the legality of the supplements, the AFL separately investigated the administration of the club's supplements program, and charged the club and senior staff with bringing the game into disrepute. The charges focussed on the poor business practices within the program, including allowing "a culture of frequent, uninformed and unregulated use of the injection of supplements" at the club, incomplete record keeping which had made it impossible to determine with certainty whether or not players had been administered banned supplements, and for failing to guarantee the health and safety of its players in its program. On 27 August, five days before round 23 and after two days of discussions between the club and the league, the following penalties were imposed relating to these charges:
Essendon was fined $2 million (staggered over three years); this was the largest fine imposed on a club in the history of Australian sport.
Essendon was ruled ineligible to participate in the 2013 AFL finals series, achieved by relegating it to ninth position on the ladder.
Essendon was stripped of draft picks in the following two drafts: in 2013, its first and second round draft picks were stripped; in 2014, it was stripped of the first and second round draft picks it would have received based on its finishing position, but was granted the last draft pick in the first round.
Senior coach James Hird was suspended from any involvement in any football club for twelve months, effective immediately.
Football operations manager Danny Corcoran was suspended from involvement in any football club for four months, with a further two-month suspended sentence, effective 1 October 2013.
Senior assistant coach Mark Thompson was fined $30,000.
Club doctor Bruce Reid had contested his charge at a hearing from the AFL Commission, which was on Thursday 29 August, 10:30pm EST.

The scandal was investigated over the following years, and ended with 34 players who were on the 2012 Essendon list being suspended for the entire 2016 AFL season as part of a partially offset two-year suspensions for using thymosin beta-4 during the scandal.

Adam Goodes–Eddie McGuire racism controversy
Goodes pointed the supporter out to security following the incident, who subsequently evicted her from the ground; after the match, Collingwood president Eddie McGuire visited the Swans' rooms to apologise "on behalf of football", and stamped out that racism would not be tolerated by the Collingwood Football Club.

Five days later, McGuire was involved in another controversy involving Goodes on his Triple M Melbourne breakfast show, when he joked that Goodes could be used to promote the King Kong musical that was to be held in Melbourne, quickly apologising on air after making the reference. McGuire initially defended his comments by saying that the remark was simply "a slip of the tongue", but admitted to vilifying Goodes in an interview later in the day, albeit unintentionally.

References

Australian Football League seasons
 
AFL season